Escucha can refer to:
 The town of Escucha in Spain
 Escucha, the Spanish equivalent of Laura Pausini album Resta in ascolto